Piotr Baron (born 5 February 1974) is a former motorcycle speedway rider from Poland.

Career 
Baron represented Poland during the 1993 Speedway World Team Cup and won the 1993 Bronze Helmet.

He spent the majority of his career riding for Wrocław, where he won three Polish league championships in 2003, 2004 and 2005.

After retiring he later became the team manager of Unia Leszno.

Major results

World Cup 
 1993 - 3rd place in Group A (7 points)

References 

1974 births
Polish speedway riders
Sportspeople from Toruń
Living people